Matías Fernando Lazo Zapata (born 11 July 2003) is a Peruvian footballer who plays as a defender for Peruvian Primera División club FBC Melgar.

Career statistics

Club

Notes

References

2003 births
Living people
People from Arequipa
Peruvian footballers
Association football defenders
FBC Melgar footballers